Grünau Charterhouse (German: Kloster or Kartause Grünau) is a former Carthusian monastery, or charterhouse, in Schollbrunn in Bavaria, Germany. It was the first Carthusian monastery in Franconia and in today's Bavaria.

Geography
It is surrounded by the wooded hills of the Spessart.

It lies in the municipal territory of Schollbrunn, part of the Main-Spessart district of Bavaria.

History 

In 1216, a chapel was consecrated in the Kropfbachtal, dedicated to the Blessed Virgin Mary, Saint Lawrence and Saint Nicholas. In the early 14th century, this chapel became the destination of pilgrims. At the chapel's location, Elisabeth von Hohenlohe, daughter of the Count of Wertheim, donated a Kartause or charterhouse in 1328. In 1333, Carthusians from Mainz, led by the first prior Heinrich Spiegel, settled here, making this the order's first monastery in Franconia and in what is modern-day Bavaria.

The initial Kartause was replaced in the early 15th century by a larger building, housing up to 24 monks. In 1446, a new church for the monastery was consecrated. The Counts of Wertheim were the Vögte of the monastery and its church served as their burial place. It is possible that monks from Grünau settled in the 14th century at the charterhouses at Erfurt and Koblenz.

A Canonical visitation in 1523 discovered a state of affairs that led to the temporary dismissal of prior Michael Lemlein. During the German Peasants' War, the monastery was sacked by peasants in 1525. That year, Count Georg von Wertheim joined the Reformation, and thus the monastery's Vogt now was a Lutheran. In 1545, the Wertheim family took over administration of the monastery's lands. The last three monks left Grünau in 1557.

However, the order fought a prolonged legal battle against the counts at the Reichskammergericht and the Hofkammergericht for restitution of the Kartause. An Imperial edict of 1629 restored property to Catholic owners and Grünau returned to the order. Only two years later, they had to flee from Swedish troops during the chaos of the Thirty Years' War. In 1635, Count Johann Dietrich von Löwenstein-Wertheim restored the buildings and half the original land. Four monks settled there.

The monastery, which had been rebuilt in the early 18th century by the monks, was turned into a Hofgut, an estate owned by the Counts, in 1820.

Today
All that remains of the monastic structures is the prior's lodging, now used for guests, the ruins of the church and the perimeter wall with its archway.

The buildings today house a restaurant and are private property. During business hours, the external areas are mostly accessible to the public.

References

Further reading
 Albert, Alfons: Die Geschichte der Kartause Grünau, Würzburg 1964
 Backmund, Norbert: Die kleineren Orden in Bayern und ihre Klöster bis zur Säkularisation, Windberg 1974, p. 64-65
 Hogg, James: Die Kartause Grünau, in: Michael Koller (ed.): Kartäuser in Franken (Kirche, Kunst und Kultur in Franken Bd. 5), Würzburg 1996, p. 79-94
 Link, Georg: Klosterbuch der Diözese Würzburg Bd. 2, Würzburg 1876, p. 288-291
 Rommel, Gustav: Geschichte der ehemaligen Kartause Grünau im Spessart ( zugl. Jahrbuch des historischen Vereins Alt-Wertheim 1932), Wertheim 1932
 Schneider, Erich: Klöster und Stifte in Mainfranken, Würzburg 1993, p. 37-38

External links 
 Restaurant website

Monasteries in Bavaria
Carthusian monasteries in Germany
1328 establishments in Europe
1803 disestablishments in the Holy Roman Empire
Main-Spessart
Spessart